Serafin Enoss Bertaso Airport  is the airport serving Chapecó, Brazil.

History
The terminal was commissioned on March 18, 1978. On October 1, 2010 the State Government of Santa Catarina authorized renovation works focusing mainly on the runway.

Airlines and destinations

Accidents and incidents
22 January 1976: a Transbrasil Embraer EMB 110C Bandeirante registration PT-TBD operating flight 107 from Chapecó to Erechim, crashed upon take-off from Chapecó. Seven of the nine passengers and crew on board died.

Access

See also

List of airports in Brazil

References

External links

Airports in Santa Catarina (state)